Usolye is a town and the administrative center of Usolsky District in Perm Krai, Russia, located on the right bank of the Kama River, opposite of the city of Berezniki and  north of Perm, the administrative center of the krai. As of the 2010 Census, its population was 5,694.

History
It was founded in 1606 as a salt mining settlement of Novoye Usolye and grew into a major salt mining center by the beginning of the 19th century. Until the end of the 18th century, it remained the Stroganov family's main locality on the Kama River. In 1895, there were forty salt wells.

In 1923, Usolye became the administrative center of Verkhnekamsky District of Ural Oblast. Between 1932 and 1940, it was a part of the town of Berezniki. It was granted town status in 1940. Due to the construction of Kama Reservoir, a portion of the town was flooded.

Administrative and municipal status
Within the framework of administrative divisions, Usolye serves as the administrative center of Usolsky District, to which it is directly subordinated. As a municipal division, the town of Usolye, together with forty-eight rural localities, is incorporated within Usolsky Municipal District as Usolskoye Urban Settlement.

Demographics

Culture

Some architectural monuments of note include the Savior Cathedral (1724–1731) with a separate bell tower (1730); the house of the Stroganovs, and Galitzine homestead (1818), which houses an architectural and ethnographic museum. There are several churches and mansions near the town.

References

Notes

Sources

External links
History of Usolye

Cities and towns in Perm Krai
Solikamsky Uyezd
Populated places on the Kama River